Bal Krishen Thapar (18 October 1921 – 6 September 1995) was an Indian archaeologist who served as the Director-general of the Archaeological Survey of India from 1978 to 1981. He was the founder of INTACH.

Early life 

Thapar was born to a cloth merchant in Ludhiana on 18 October 1921. On completing his M.A. in History from the University of Punjab, Lahore, Thapar joined the Archaeological Survey of India and trained under Mortimer Wheeler at the newly established Institute of Archaeology in Taxila. Thapar obtained a doctorate in West Asian archaeology from the Heidelberg University.

In the Archaeological Survey of India 

Thapar participated in the archaeological excavations in Kalibangan, Purana Qila and Maski. He was also involved in ASI's excavations in Farah Valley and Begram in Afghanistan. Other excavations he conducted and led include archaeological projects at Hastinapur, Sisupalgarh, Rupnagar, Kausambi, Porkalam, Somnath, Prakash, Kuchai, and Juna Pani.

Thapar edited Archaeological Survey of India's official journals Indian Archaeology from 1973 to 1979 and Purattatva from 1974 to 1978. In 1978, Thapar succeeded M. N. Deshpande as Director-general of the ASI and served till retirement in 1981.

Professional Memberships 
Thapar was a member of many academic bodies, both in India and abroad, including:
 Chairman, Centre for Cultural Resources & Training (1982–92)
 Secretary and Founding Member, Indian National Trust for Art & Cultural Heritage (1986–94)
 Member Advisory Committee, American Institute of Indian Studies (1988–94)
 Vice President, Executive Committee, ICOMOS (1975–84)
 Member Permanent Council, Congress Internationale des Sciences Prehistoriques et Protohistoriques
 Member Indian National Committee for cooperation with UNESCO (1987–91)
 Member International Editorial Committee of UNESCO – Projects on Scientific & Cultural History of Mankind and History of Civilisation of Central Asia
 Member, UNESCO Consultative Committee on Silk Roads & Roads of Dialogue project
 Correspondent Member, German Archaeological Institute at Berlin
 Secretary, Central Advisory Board of Archaeology in India
 Member, Indian Science Congress Association
 Member, Radiocarbon Dating Committee

Fellowships and awards 

In 1992, Thapar was awarded the Padma Shri for Literature and Education by the Government of India. Thapar was awarded the Alexander Von Humboldt Scholarship in 1959. In 1993, he was awarded the Asiatic Society of Bengal medal, and the Jawaharlal Nehru Centenary Medal. Thapar was also a Royal Asiatic Society of Great Britain and Ireland Fellow; Churchill College Fellow (1971), and a Jawaharlal Nehru Memorial Fellow (1981).

Death 

Thapar died at New Delhi on 6 September 1995.

Selected publications

Indian megaliths in Asian context - with Arun Kumar Sharma (1994)

Conservation of the Indian heritage - with Bridget Allchin and Frank Raymond Allchin (1989)

Recent archaeological discoveries in India (1985)

Approaches to the Archaeological Heritage Chapter 7, India - Henry Cleere (1984)

History of Humanity: Scientific and Cultural Development.  Book Chapter: The Indus Valley: 3000-1500 BC. Dani, A. H. and Mohan, J.-P. (eds.), Vol. II UNESCO and Rutledge: 246-265 - with Mohammed Rafique Mughal (1996)

References 

 

1921 births
1995 deaths
Directors General of the Archaeological Survey of India
University of the Punjab alumni
20th-century Indian archaeologists
Recipients of the Padma Shri in literature & education
Scientists from Ludhiana
Indian institute directors
Indian expatriates in Germany